Ashrafpur is a village in Nabinagar Upazila, Brahmanbaria District in the Chittagong Division of eastern Bangladesh. There are two mosques, one school and one madrasah.

References

Populated places in Brahmanbaria District